Bangial is a large village in Langrial, Gujrat Union Council of Kharian Tehsil, Gujrat District, Pakistan.

References

Populated places in Gujrat District